6882 Sormano is an stony Eunomia asteroid from the middle region of the asteroid belt, approximately  in diameter. It was discovered on 5 February 1995, by Italian amateur astronomers Piero Sicoli and Valter Giuliani at Sormano Astronomical Observatory in northern Italy. The asteroid was named for the Italian mountain-village of Sormano and its discovering observatory.

Orbit and classification 

Sormano is a member of the Eunomia family, a large group of S-type asteroids and the most prominent family in the intermediate main-belt. It orbits the Sun at a distance of 2.3–2.8 AU once every 4 years and 1 month (1,489 days). Its orbit has an eccentricity of 0.10 and an inclination of 14° with respect to the ecliptic.

Naming 

This minor planet was named in honor of the Italian mountain-village of Sormano and its discovering nearby observatory. It is funded, built and operated by the "Gruppo Astrofili Brianza", a group of Italian amateur astronomers who have discovered numerous minor planets. The  was published by the Minor Planet Center on 3 May 1996.

Physical characteristics

Rotation and shape 

In September 2010, a rotational lightcurve of Sormano was obtained from photometric observations made at the Palomar Transient Factory in California. It gave a rotation period of  hours with a high brightness variation of 0.71 magnitude, indicative of a non-spheroidal shape. A similar period of 3.998 hours was derived from remodeled data of the Lowell photometric database.

Diameter and albedo 

According to the survey carried out by NASA's Wide-field Infrared Survey Explorer with its subsequent NEOWISE mission, Sormano measures 7.6 to 8.0 kilometers in diameter and its surface has an albedo between 0.269 and 0.300. The Collaborative Asteroid Lightcurve Link assumes an albedo 0.21 – derived from 15 Eunomia, the family's largest member and namesake – and calculates a diameter of 6.69 kilometers with an absolute magnitude of 13.19.

References

External links 
 Lightcurve Database Query (LCDB), at www.minorplanet.info
 Dictionary of Minor Planet Names, Google books
 Asteroids and comets rotation curves, CdR – Geneva Observatory, Raoul Behrend
 Discovery Circumstances: Numbered Minor Planets (5001)-(10000) – Minor Planet Center
 
 

006882
006882
Discoveries by Piero Sicoli
Discoveries by Valter Giuliani
Named minor planets
19950205